The Archdiocese of Lubango is the Metropolitan See for the Ecclesiastical province of Lubango in Angola. The cathedral of the archdiocese is the Cathedral of St. Joseph, Lubango.

History

 27 July 1955: Established as Diocese of Sá da Bandeira from Diocese of Nova Lisboa 
 3 February 1977: Promoted as Metropolitan Archdiocese of Lubango

Bishops

Ordinaries, in reverse chronological order
Metropolitan Archbishops of Lubango (Roman rite), below
Archbishop Gabriel Mbilingi: 5 September 2009 - present
Archbishop Zacarias Kamwenho, C.SS.R.: 15 January 1997 - 5 September 2009
Archbishop Manuel Franklin da Costa: 12 September 1986 – 15 January 1997
Archbishop, later Cardinal, Alexandre do Nascimento: 3 February 1977 – 16 February 1986, Cardinal in 1983; appointed Archbishop of Luanda
Archbishop Eurico Dias Nogueira: 19 February 1972 – 3 November 1977
Bishop of Sá da Bandeira (Roman rite), below
Bishop Altino Ribeiro de Santana: 27 July 1955 – 19 February 1972, appointed Bishop of Beira, Mozambique

Coadjutor archbishops
Zacarias Kamwenho (1995-1997)
Gabriel Mbilingi, C.S.Sp. (2006-2009)

Suffragan dioceses
Diocese of Menongue
Diocese of Namibe
Diocese of Ondjiva

Sources
GCatholic.org

Lubango